Seebers Branch is a stream in Knox and Lewis Counties in the U.S. state of Missouri.

Seebers Branch has the name of the Seeber family, original owners of the site.

See also
List of rivers of Missouri

References

Rivers of Knox County, Missouri
Rivers of Lewis County, Missouri
Rivers of Missouri